The 2001 Primera B de Chile was the 51st completed season of the Primera B de Chile.

Table

See also
Chilean football league system

References

External links
 RSSSF 2001

Primera B de Chile seasons
Primera B
Chil